The Jersey Spartan Athletics Club or JSAC is an athletics club based in Jersey, at the FB Playing Fields, in St. Clement. The club is affiliated with UK Athletics, and Amateur Athletic Association of England.

History

2009
Club junior Oliver Terry won a gold medal at the inter-counties cross-country and world trials in Nottingham on 7 March 2009.

2012
Sam Firby, former cycling competitor in the Commonwealth Games, won the "JSAC Fitness First Spring 10k race" on 5 April 2012.

See also
JSAC Half Marathon

External links
 Official site

References

Athletics clubs in Jersey